Garry BH is an Indian film editor who works in Telugu cinema. He has worked as an editor for more than twenty films.

Now Garry is Directing a sequel movie starring Nikhil named SPY1 
His friend, Ravikanth Perepu, who was directing Kshanam (2016)offered him to work on the production team. Abburi Ravi mentored Garry on the narrative styles of films and film perspectives. For the film, he was part of several departments including direction, photography and editing. He worked as an additional editor for Ghazi (2017). Garry went on to work on several notable films including Goodachari (2018), Evaru (2019), Aswathama (2020), and HIT: The First Case (2020).. He has pursued his graduation in Gitam Dental College from 2006.

Filmography 

 2016: Kshanam (assistant director and actor)
2018: Goodachari
2018: Idam Jagath
2018: My Dear Marthandam
2019: Mithai
2019: Jessie
2019: Evaru
2019: Rama Chakkani Seetha
2019: Operation Gold Fish (also producer)
2019: Athaha
2019: Heza
2020: Aswathama
2020: HIT: The First Case 
2020: College Kumar
2020: Eureka
2020: Krishna and His Leela
2021: Paagal
2021: Ichata Vahanamulu Niluparadu
2022: Virgin Story
2022: Dongalunnaru Jaagratha
2022: HIT: The Second Case
2022: Panchathantram

References

External links 

Living people
Telugu film editors
Year of birth missing (living people)
Indian film editors
Film editors from Andhra Pradesh
People from Visakhapatnam
People from Visakhapatnam district